Edge Hill, also known as Kennedy Home, is an example of Greek Revival architecture.  It was listed on the National Register of Historic Places in 2008.

References

Houses on the National Register of Historic Places in Virginia
National Register of Historic Places in Henrico County, Virginia
Houses in Henrico County, Virginia